Giovanni Locatelli may refer to:

Giovanni Battista Locatelli (opera director) (1713–1785), Italian opera director
Giovanni Battista Locatelli (sculptor) (1734-1805)
Giovanni Locatelli (bishop) in Roman Catholic Diocese of San Marino-Montefeltro